Jaroslav Jílek (born 22 October 1989) is a Czech athlete specialising in the javelin throw. He represented his country at the 2017 World Championships without reaching the final.

His personal best in the event is 83.19 seconds set in Kawasaki in 2016.

International competitions

References

1989 births
Living people
Czech male javelin throwers
World Athletics Championships athletes for the Czech Republic